Schizothorax rotundimaxillaris is a species of ray-finned fish in the genus Schizothorax from Yunnan.

References 

Schizothorax
Fish described in 1992